Colone may refer to:
 Bartolo Colón (born 1973), Dominican-American professional baseball
 Joe Colone (1924–2009), American professional basketball player 
 Ann Colone (1930–2007), American radio and television broadcaster
 Adam de Colone (c. 1572 – 1651), Dutch painter active in Scotland
 Carlos Colone (born 1979), Puerto Rican and Canadian professional wrestler better known internationally by his ring name Carlito

See also
 Colón (currency)